Neustadt an der Weinstraße (formerly known as  ;) is a town in Rhineland-Palatinate, Germany. With 53,300 inhabitants , it is the largest town called Neustadt.

Geography

Location 

The town itself lies in the western park of the Rhine-Neckar Metropolitan Region between the Haardt mountains, the eastern edge of the Palatinate Forest, and the western edge of the Upper Rhine Plain in the middle of the Palatinate wine region, an area that is around 10 km wide and 85 km long. The Speyerbach river flows through the town from west to east as does the Rehbach, which separates from the Speyerbach within the town at the Winzinger Wassergescheid before emptying into the River Rhine several kilometres further north than the Speyerbach.

Municipal divisions

Town and town quarters 
Over time the original town and its surrounding settlements, hamlets and farmsteads have grown together, blurring the original boundaries of the town. Today these have become the town quarters of Branchweilerhof in the southeast, the Hambacher Höhe to the southwest, the Afrikaviertel (so named because its streets are named after researchers into Africa) and the Schöntal to the west. These quarters do not have any particular privileges and are not legally incorporated districts, although some voting precinct borders match part of the boundaries.

The best-known quarter is Winzingen which was first recorded in 774 and thus much older than the Neustadt or "new town" founded in the early 13th century. It was a wine growing village that lay below the Speyerbach, i.e. to the east of the new settlement. In 1892 it was incorporated into the then Neustadt an der Haardt. Since then the town has grown beyond Winzingen to the east.

Inclusive all its incorporated subdistricts, Neustadt covers an area of 11,713.5 hectares. Of that, 5,020.0 ha is woodland, 2,216.0 ha are vineyards, 2,300.0 ha are used for other agricultural purposes, 1,607.0 is built up and 50.0 ha are industrial and retail areas.

Subdistricts 

In 1969 the villages of Diedesfeld, Geinsheim, Gimmeldingen, Haardt, Hambach, Königsbach, Lachen-Speyerdorf and Mußbach were incorporated into the borough, followed in 1974 by Duttweiler. These villages lie between one and ten kilometres from the main town. They are legally constituted subdistricts, are known as Ortsteil and have a parish chair (Ortsvorsteher) to whom some of the functions of the former mayors have been transferred.

Population in 2012

Neighbouring communities 
Neustadt's neighbouring municipalities running clockwise from the north are the small town of Deidesheim the municipalities of Ruppertsberg, Meckenheim, Haßloch and Maikammer, the small town of Lambrecht and the municipality of Lindenberg.

Climate 

Annual precipitation figures are in the lower quartile of those recorded in Germany; only 12% of the monitoring stations of the German Weather Service register lower values . The driest month is March; the most rain falls in June, 1.7 times more than in March. However, they vary only slightly and are very evenly distributed throughout the year; only 3% of the weather stations register lower seasonal variations in precipitation.

So the values differ, with temperatures being a little lower and rainfall higher. Its annual precipitation measured .

History

Chronological table

Chronology

Early history
The oldest traces of settlement and archaeological finds indicate that Celts used to live in the area of the present town. They have left behind ringworks, clay pots, coins and weapons that date to the time around 150 B.C. The Romans probably took possession of the land around 20 A. D. Around 400 it was taken by the Alemanni who were superseded in turn around 500 A.D. by the Germanic Franks.

There are no precise details for the centuries after the end of Roman rule, but it is known that villages already existed before the actual town of Neustadt was founded: Winzingen, today a town quarter, was already mentioned in 774. The subdistricts of Mußbach, Lachen-Speyerdorf, Geinsheim, Duttweiler and Hambach are also considerable older than the main town. In general it is fair to say that the history of Neustadt is closely linked to that of the Palatinate region.

Middle ages
Just a few decades after its foundation in the early 13th century, Neustadt was granted town rights on 6 April 1275 based on those given to Speyer.

Town quarters
In the Late Middle Ages Neustadt was divided into four town quarters, whose names indicate the status and occupations of their inhabitants or give important local information:

In the Lauerviertel (from Loheviertel = "Tanbark Quarter") next to the Speyerbach worked the tanners. The Kesselringviertel was named after an influential family of the 14th century. In the Frauenviertel ("Women's Quarter") were ecclesiastical possessions under the patronage of Saint Mary's. The Jewish community lived in the Judenviertel ("Jewish Quarter").

Towards the end of the 15th century, other quarters were established outside the town fortifications: the Stadtgasserviertel, the Kirschgartenviertel and the Ägyptenvorstadt.

Reformation
In the Peasants' Uprising, rebellious peasant bands entered the town unopposed on 6 May 1525.

During the Reformation, Louis the Pacific ruled the Palatinate until 1544 and strove for reconciliation. His 1538 religion edict allowed Lutherans to preach and take communion. Equally even-handed was his brother and successor, Frederick the Wise. Not until his successor were there strict Protestant rulers. When Frederick III died in 1576, he left a clause in his will that his Lutheran son, Louis VI should not inherit the Ämter of Kaiserslautern and Neustadt, but that they should go instead to his Calvinist brother, John Casimir.

In 1578, Count Palatine John Casimir founded the Neustadt College that was named after him, the Casimirianum, because his Lutheran brother, Louis had cleared the university in Heidelberg of Calvinists; John Casimir was active as an advocate of the reformed faith and offered the exiled professors and students asylum. When he moved to Heidelberg in 1583 in order to take over the regency for his still under-age son there after the death of the brother's reign, Neustadt's short time as a university seat ended.

17th century

Denominational disputes over the following century were no longer pursued purely by argument, but with weapons, and the Palatinate was invaded by one campaign after another. Neustadt was conquered six times during the Thirty Years' War; in 1622 by the Spaniards, in 1631 by Sweden, in 1635 by Imperial troops, in 1638 by troops of Duke Bernard of Weimar, in 1639 by the French under Field Marshal Henri II d'Orleans, Duke of Longueville and 1644 again by the French. After each occasion the occupying forces attempted to enforce their confession.

Unlike other Palatine towns, Neustadt survived the War of the Palatine Succession (1689–1697) almost unscathed.

18th and 19th centuries
In 1744 of the town population of 2,496, 1,676 were reformed, 620 were Roman Catholics and 200 were Lutherans. Jews were not included in these statistics.

In the 18th century the town lost its medieval appearance, because its militarily obsolete and superfluous town walls were demolished. When, in 1722, the state road to Mannheim, the new residence of the Elector had been built (today the B 38), in 1723 the northern town wall was pierced.

Following the seizure of the Left Bank of the Rhine during the French Revolution in 1797–98, Neustadt became just an insignificant administrative centre, the canton capital of the département of Donnersberg. Napoleon passed through the town on his retreat from Erfurt to Paris and its official celebrated his visit. When, five years later, parts of the emperor's army, defeated near Leipzig, marched through the town the sentiment was, however, quite the opposite.

In 1815, Neustadt became part of the Kingdom of Bavaria until 1945, along with the rest of the Palatinate which was one of 8 Bavarian districts (Rhine District). As of 1837 the district was renamed as Pfalz. As a result of this resubordination, in 1818 the town became the seat of a Landkommissariat (called a Bezirksamt from 1862 and a Landkreis from 1939). In 1832 the Hambach Festival took place near the town. In 1847, Neustadt was connected to the railway network by the Palatine Ludwig Railway.

20th century
A Workers and Soldiers Council was established during the German Revolution of 1918. Three delegates were sent to see Kurt Eisner, the premier of newly founded People's State of Bavaria. These delegates consisted of a member of the Majority Social Democratic Party of Germany, a member of the emergent German People's Party and a third linked to the interests of the local wine trade. However, Eisner failed to take notice of their concerns and despite his subsequent assertion that the Pfalz was an integral part of Bavaria, this indifference helped fuel separatist sentiment in the area.

According to the Armistice Agreement the Pfalz region fell within the French zone during the occupation of the Rhineland. The Siamese Expeditionary Forces occupied Neustadt following the end of World War I.

In 1920 Neustadt, like six others in the Palatinate, separated from its Bezirksamt and became an independent town.

Neustadt's role during the Nazi era began in 1927 when it became the seat of the Gauleiter for the Nazi Party. It retained this function de facto until 1945, although in 1939 Kaiserslautern was nominated as the Gauhauptstadt ("capital of the Gau") and the state authorities, who were formed in 1940 from the Palatine and Saarland administrations in Speyer and Saarbrücken and were led by the Gauleiter in personal union, were also not based in Neustadt. The town was given the function of a normal Palatine seat of administration on 8 September 1945, In 1946 it became the seat of the Rhineland-Palatinate province (Regierungsbezirk) of the Palatinate.

On 7 June 1969 the hitherto independent municipalities of Geinsheim, Gimmeldingen, Haardt an der Weinstraße, Hambach an der Weinstraße, Königsbach an der Weinstraße, Lachen-Speyerdorf, Mussbach an der Weinstraße and Diedesfeld were incorporated into the town's borough. On 16 March 1974 they were followed by Duttweiler.

Etymology 
Officially abbreviated as Neustadt a. d. Weinstr., the name can be shortened as Neustadt/Weinstrasse (as on train departure and arrival boards) or Neustadt (Weinstrasse). The name literally means "new town on the wine route", as it lies on the German wine route (Deutsche Weinstrasse), in Rhineland-Palatinate, in Germany.
It is one of several dozen German and Austrian places called Neustadt. These new towns are typically differentiated by the rivers upon which they lie (e. g., Neustadt (Aisch)), the regions they are located in (e. g., Neustadt/Hessen) or, in this case, a peculiar distinctive feature – namely Weinstraße – "Wine Route."

Culture, nature and sights

Culture 
The following venues are available for cultural events: the Saalbau as a theatre and concert hall, the restored Herrenhof Mußbach as a cultural centre, the open air stage in the grounds of Villa Böhm, the Kleinkunstbühne, die reblaus in the Catacombe Theatre, the Theater in der Kurve in Hambach and the historic Steinhäuser Hof as the home venue of Jazzclub NW.

Nature 
Neustadt's borough extends from the Rhine Plain into the Palatine Forest Nature Park, the largest contiguous forest region in Germany and part of the Palatine Forest-North Vosges Biosphere Reserve. There is a total of twelve nature reserves in the borough: Am Wolfsberg, Lochbusch-Königswiesen, Mußbacher Baggerweiher, Haardtrand–Am Häuselberg, Haardtrand–Berggewanne, Haardtrand–Am Wetterkreuz, Haardtrand–Im Erb, Haardtrand–Am Klausental, Haardtrand–Schloßberg, Haardtrand–Am Heidelberg, Haardtrand–Am Sonnenweg und Rehbachwiesen-Langwiesen.

Structures 

Neustadt's main attraction is its historic Altstadt or Old Town. Notable buildings include its 14th century collegiate church, the former university of Casimirianum and the Steinhäuser Hof. More recently the Elwetritsche Fountain by Gernot Rumpf and the murals by Werner Holz have been added.

Outside the residential areas there are palaces and castles: Hambach Castle, the Wolfsburg, Winzingen Castle, Haardt Castle and the rather more distant Spangenberg Castle above the Elmstein Valley. In the quarter of Hambacher Höhe, by the edge of the Haardt, lies the Abbey of the Sacred Heart.

The outlying villages also have their sights; for example Mußbach with its Old Church of St. John, the manor house, White House and Carl Theodor Hof; or Gimmeldingen with St. Nicholas' Church, the Mithras Shrine, the Old Castle and King Ludwig's Pavilion.

Monuments 

In Neustadt, the artist, Gunter Demnig, has laid 41 so-called Stolpersteine, metal paving stones, in memory of the Jewish victims of Nazism. The first Stolperstein was laid on 6 December 2002 in front of the Kurfürst Ruprecht Gymnasium in Landwehrstraße in memory of Karl Strauß, a former teacher at the school.

On 10 March 2013 the Justice Minister for Rhineland-Palatinate, Jochen Hartloff, and Neustadt's Lord Mayor, Hans Georg Löffler, opened the memorial site to Nazi victims which had been established in the prison building of the old Turenne Barracks by a friends' association founded in 2009. Eighty years earlier, on 10 March 1933, the Nazis had established a concentration camp in the barracks for several months under the title of Schutzhaft- und Arbeitslager ("Protective Detention and Labour Camp"). About 500 men from over 80 Palatine municipalities were detained here who, due to their political or religious activities, had fallen foul of the authorities.

Museums 
The town is home to the following museums: the town museum, Villa Böhm, the Otto Dill Museum, the Palatine Bible Museum, the "Getreidekasten" Vineyard Museum in the Herrenhof and the Neustadt/Weinstraße Railway Museum.

Regular events 
Since 1949, as part of the German Wine Festival, the German Wine Queen has been chosen and crowned in Neustadt. The high point of the festival, which traditionally takes place at the end of September/beginning of October, is the largest Vintners' Parade in Germany.

Other wine festivals take place regularly, usually at weekends from almond blossom time in March/April until October. Especially well known are the Gimmeldingen Almond Blossom Festival, the Eselshautfest in Mußbach and the Andergasser Fest in Hambach.

At the end of August the German Wine Road Adventure Day takes place, when the German Wine Road is closed to motorised traffic – even in Neustadt – and is only open to cyclists and pedestrians.

Patronage 
Neustadt was the patron of the U-Boat U 26 in the German Bundesmarine. Since 1978 it has sponsored a Lufthansa Airbus and, since 2000, ICE train of the Deutsche Bahn. In March 2007 it took on the sponsorship of a train on the Rhine-Neckar S-Bahn.

Economy 
The largest local employer is BASF, located in Ludwigshafen am Rhein – one of the largest chemical companies in the world.

Symbols 
The symbols of Neustadt are Elwedritsche, mythical animals of local folklore. Depictions of them are carved on a well in the town centre.

Transport 
Neustadt is less than an hour away from larger cities such as Mannheim, Ludwigshafen, Heidelberg and Frankfurt.

Twin towns – sister cities

Neustadt an der Weinstraße is twinned with:

 Echt-Susteren, Netherlands
 Lincoln, England, United Kingdom
 Mâcon, France
 Manchester, United States
 Quanzhou, China
 Wernigerode, Germany
 Yenişehir, Turkey

Notable people

Frederick II, Elector Palatine (1482–1556), Elector of the Palatinate from 1544 to 1556
Johannes von Geissel (1796–1864), Cardinal, Archbishop of Cologne, Bishop of Speyer
August Rothpletz (1853–1918), geologist, paleontologist
Georg Balthazar von Neumayer, German polar explorer and scientist, died here in 1909
Ludwig Wolff (1857–1919), chemist
Franz Xaver Kugler (1862–1929), astronomer, chemist, mathematician, theologian
Albert Fraenkel (1864–1938), physician, tuberculosis and heart researcher
Karl Helfferich (1872–1924), banker, politician (DNVP) in the Weimar Republic
Hans Geiger (1882–1945), physicist, inventor of the Geiger counter
Hermann Künneth (1892–1975), mathematician
Franz Pfeiffer (1900–1979), lawyer
 (1903–1966), jurist, SS official
Walter Bruch (1908–1990), electrical engineering technician, inventor of the PAL color television system
Willi Geiger (1909–1994), lawyer
Fritz Wiedemann (1920–1987), painter, sculptor
Herbert Culmann (1921–1998), lawyer, CEO of Deutsche Lufthansa AG
Karlheinz Rudolph (1923–1994), television journalist
Günther Osche (1926–2009), evolutionary biologist, ecologist, parasitologist
Alfred Mechtersheimer (1939–2018), political scientist, politician, Member of Bundestag
Jörg Zimmermann (born 1944), diplomat
Heiner Goebbels (born 1952), musician, composer, radio play director, director
Gregor Braun (born 1955), track cyclist, road bicycle racer 
Malu Dreyer (born 1961), jurist, politician (SPD), Rhineland-Palatinate Minister President since 2013
Andrea Mohr (born 1963), author, former drug smuggler
Uwe Wolf (born 1967), footballer
Mario Basler (born 1968), football player, coach
Bernhard Hoëcker (born 1970), comedian
Sin With Sebastian (born 1971), pop singer
Gustav Policella (born 1975), football player, coach
Danko Bošković (born 1982), footballer
Moritz Oeler (born 1985), water polo player
Joseph Moog (born 1987), classical pianist and composer
Dominique Heintz (born 1993), footballer
Kevin Akpoguma (born 1995), footballer

References

External links

Neustadt/Weinstrasse tourist information in English
Neustadt-Links – about 1200 links to enterprises and organizations in Neustadt (in German)
French garrison in Neustadt (in French)

 
Towns in Rhineland-Palatinate
Palatinate Forest
Anterior Palatinate
Palatinate (region)